Erich Strobl (born 3 May 1933) is an Austrian retired footballer and manager, known for his extensive period at Simmering.

International career
He made his debut for Austria in a November 1960 friendly match away against Hungary and earned a total of 5 caps, scoring no goals. His final international was an April 1962 friendly away against Ireland.

References

External links
 

1933 births
Living people
Place of birth missing (living people)
Association football defenders
Austrian footballers
Austria international footballers
1. Simmeringer SC players
FK Austria Wien players
Austrian Football Bundesliga players
2. Liga (Austria) players
Austrian football managers
1. Simmeringer SC managers